West Point Historic District is a national historic district located at West Point, King William County, Virginia. The district encompasses 75 contributing buildings and 1 contributing object in the town of West Point.  The district includes residential, commercial, and institutional buildings and is notable for its variety of late-19th- and early-20th-century styles and building types. Notable buildings include the William Mitchell House (c. 1850), Anderson-Mayo House (c. 1850), Ware House (c. 1870), St. John's Episcopal Church (1882), Mt. Nebo Baptist Church (1887), West Point United Methodist Church (1889), O'Connor Hotel and annex (c. 1895), Treat-Medlin House (1898), Gouldman House (1923), First Baptist Church (1926), U.S. Post Office (1931), West Point Town Office Building, Citizens and Exchange Bank (1923), and Beverly Allen School (1930s).

It was listed on the National Register of Historic Places in 1996.

References

Historic districts on the National Register of Historic Places in Virginia
Queen Anne architecture in Virginia
Gothic Revival architecture in Virginia
Italianate architecture in Virginia
Buildings and structures in King William County, Virginia
National Register of Historic Places in King William County, Virginia